Marcelo Moreira Palma (born June 2, 1966) is a retired male race walker from Brazil. He is a two-time Olympian (1988 and 1992).

Currently, Marcelo Prahas is a psychologist working with Clinical and Sports Psychology:  .

Personal best
20 km - 1:21:30 São Paulo Jun 1991 - South American Record (best performance in track at this time)
20 km: 1:22:23 hrs –  São Paulo, 25 March 1990

Achievements

References

External links

sports-reference

1966 births
Living people
Brazilian male racewalkers
Athletes (track and field) at the 1988 Summer Olympics
Athletes (track and field) at the 1992 Summer Olympics
Athletes (track and field) at the 1991 Pan American Games
Olympic athletes of Brazil
Pan American Games medalists in athletics (track and field)
Pan American Games bronze medalists for Brazil
Medalists at the 1991 Pan American Games